The 2014–15 Idaho Vandals women's basketball team represented the University of Idaho during the 2014–15 NCAA Division I women's basketball season. The Vandals, led by seventh year head coach Jon Newlee, played their home games at the Cowan Spectrum with a couple of early season games at Memorial Gym, and were members of the Big Sky Conference. This was their first year returning to the Big Sky, the conference they were charter members of and called home from 1988–1996. They finished the season 14–15, 8–10 in Big Sky play to finish in a tie for eighth place. They failed to qualify for the Big Sky women's tournament.

Roster

Schedule

|-
!colspan=9 style="background:#B18E5F; color:#000000;"| Exhibition

|-
!colspan=9 style="background:#B18E5F; color:#000000;"| Regular Season

See also
2014–15 Idaho Vandals men's basketball team

References

Idaho Vandals women's basketball seasons
Idaho
Van
Van